Islamgulovo (İslamğol) is a rural locality (a village) in Araslanovsky Selsoviet, Meleuzovsky District, Bashkortostan, Russia. The population was 48 as of 2010. There are 2 streets.

Geography 
Islamgulovo is located 11 km northeast of Meleuz (the district's administrative centre) by road. Yangi-Aul is the nearest rural locality.

References 

Rural localities in Meleuzovsky District